

Filmography 
This is a list of filmography of Leslie Cheung, a Hong Kong film actor.

References 

Male actor filmographies
Hong Kong filmographies
Leslie Cheung